Epigynum may refer to:

Epigynum (plant), a genus of plants in the family Apocynaceae
Epigynum (spider), the external genital structure of female spiders